Hugo Miguel Ribeiro Leal (born 21 May 1980) is a Portuguese former professional footballer who played as a central midfielder. He was also a reliable set piece taker.

He amassed Primeira Liga totals of 148 matches and nine goals over 11 seasons, having started his career with Benfica. He also played professionally, albeit with little impact in the countries' top division, in Spain and France.

Leal played once with the Portugal national team.

Club career
Born in the Lisbon outskirts of Cascais, Leal started his career with local S.L. Benfica and, not yet 17, made his Primeira Liga debut against S.C. Espinho, in a 2–0 home win on 20 April 1997. He made his breakthrough in the 1998–99 season, playing 27 league games and scoring three goals; in between, he served a loan stint at Benfica's farm team F.C. Alverca, at the time also in the top division.

In the summer of 1999, Leal moved abroad with Spain's Atlético Madrid. In his first year the club was relegated to the Segunda División, and in his only goal he was also sent off, in a 13 May 2000 home draw against Sevilla FC. He stayed for the following campaign but could not help the Colchoneros win promotion back into La Liga, although he had established in the starting XI (36 matches, four goals).

Leal joined Paris Saint-Germain F.C. in 2001, helping the capital side to two French Cup finals in consecutive years. However, on 8 March 2002, in a match against FC Lorient for that competition, he suffered a serious injury to his left knee, being sidelined for the rest of the campaign after undergoing surgery and also missing that year's UEFA European Under-21 Championship; his playing time was gradually cut, and a mutual contract termination was agreed on 4 August 2004.

In August 2004, Leal signed a four-year contract with FC Porto. He spent six months with the team before moving to Académica de Coimbra on loan as he did not get enough playing time; at this point, he seriously consider ending his playing career.

For 2005–06, Leal moved to S.C. Braga, but left the club by mutual agreement in January 2007 after totalling only 17 league appearances in nearly two seasons. In August, he returned to Lisbon and joined C.F. Os Belenenses in a one-year deal, in another campaign severely cut short due to injuries.

Leal agreed to a one-year contract with newly promoted C.D. Trofense in late October 2008. Following their top-flight relegation, he returned to Spain after eight years, joining UD Salamanca of the second tier in a 1+1 deal; second year only if promotion was attained.

During his only season with the Castile and León side, Leal was an undisputed starter, but not only did they not promote but almost suffered relegation. The 30-year-old returned to his country in late July 2010, signing for Vitória de Setúbal. In his third game, at former club Benfica, he missed a penalty kick to equalise the score after the opponents had just been reduced to ten men, and Vitória eventually lost 3–0.

On 5 June 2012, the 32-year-old Leal returned to G.D. Estoril Praia after 21 years, on a one-year contract. In March 2015, following José Couceiro's departure, both he – who worked for his former youth club in the board of directors– and former assistant Fabiano took the reins until the end of the campaign, eventually leading the team to the 12th position in the top flight; in July, the former was appointed the sole head coach.

International career
Leal participated with the Portuguese under-20 team in the 1999 FIFA World Youth Championship held in Nigeria, exiting in the round of 16 following a penalty shootout loss to Japan (1–1 after 120 minutes). He also helped the under-16 side win the 1995 and the 1996 UEFA European Under-16 Championships.

Aged 18, Leal earned one cap for the full side, a 0–0 draw with the Netherlands in Paris on 19 February 1999.

Honours
Paris Saint-Germain
Coupe de France: 2003–04; Runner-up 2002–03
UEFA Intertoto Cup: 2001

Porto
Supertaça Cândido de Oliveira: 2004

Portugal
UEFA European Under-16 Championship: 1995, 1996

References

External links

1980 births
Living people
Sportspeople from Cascais
Portuguese footballers
Association football midfielders
Primeira Liga players
Liga Portugal 2 players
S.L. Benfica footballers
F.C. Alverca players
FC Porto players
Associação Académica de Coimbra – O.A.F. players
S.C. Braga players
C.F. Os Belenenses players
C.D. Trofense players
Vitória F.C. players
G.D. Estoril Praia players
La Liga players
Segunda División players
Atlético Madrid footballers
UD Salamanca players
Ligue 1 players
Paris Saint-Germain F.C. players
Portugal youth international footballers
Portugal under-21 international footballers
Portugal B international footballers
Portugal international footballers
Portuguese expatriate footballers
Expatriate footballers in Spain
Expatriate footballers in France
Portuguese expatriate sportspeople in Spain
Portuguese expatriate sportspeople in France
Portuguese football managers
Primeira Liga managers
G.D. Estoril Praia managers